Karen Witten is a New Zealand public health academic. She is currently a full professor at Massey University.

Academic career

Witten's 2005 PhD geography thesis from the University of Auckland concerned the six diverse suburban localities in Auckland and the implications of living there for parents raising children and the impacts on health and health inequality. The title of her thesis was Placing caregiving: parenting in diverse localities in suburban Auckland.

Witten has worked at the University of Auckland and Massey University, where her work has continued to relate to geographic determiners of health and health inequality, studying things such as fast-food locations, open spaces and bicycling.

Selected works

References

External links
 

Living people
New Zealand women academics
Year of birth missing (living people)
Academic staff of the University of Auckland
University of Auckland alumni
New Zealand geographers
New Zealand psychologists
New Zealand women psychologists
Academic staff of the Massey University